Friend.ship with Krist-Singto is a Thai web series of GMMTV hosted by Perawat Sangpotirat (Krist) and Prachaya Ruangroj (Singto), both lead actors of SOTUS: The Series (2016) and SOTUS S: The Series (2017), currently available for streaming on YouTube and LINE TV.

Each episode features different places where Krist and Singto travel and try different activities. The series premiered on 15 July 2019 and aired every 15th day of the month. It aired its last episode on 15 December 2019.

Episodes

Reception 
In the LINE TV Thailand online TV ratings report for July 2020, the web series ranked third in the variety category with a rating of 0.0339% and a unique audience proportion of 75% female and 25% male. By the next month, it ranked fifth in the same category with a rating of 0.0088% and a unique audience proportion of 79% female and 21% male.

References

External links 
 Youtube Playlist 
 GMMTV

2019 web series debuts
2019 web series endings
2010s YouTube series
Thai web series
GMMTV